Bishrampur may refer to:
Bishrampur, Agra, India
Bishrampur, Chhattisgarh, India
Bishrampur, Jharkhand, India
Bishrampur, Bara, Nepal
Bishrampur, Rautahat, Nepal